Niclas Barud (born 22 March 1988) is a Swedish handball player who plays for Alingsås HK in the Swedish elite league. Niclas represented Aalborg Håndbold in Denmark for three years where he won the Danish championship. After his years in Denmark, he played 2 years in Germany and for Göppingen in Bundesliga. In Göppingen he won the Euro League twice. He has also represented the Swedish national team.

References

1988 births
Living people
Swedish male handball players
People from Partille Municipality
IK Sävehof players
Aalborg Håndbold players
Sportspeople from Västra Götaland County
21st-century Swedish people